Dimitar Karadžovski (born October 7, 1984) is a Macedonian professional basketball player who plays for Pelister of the Macedonian First League.

Professional career 
During his career, Karadžovski played for MZT Skopje, Ungmennafélagið Skallagrímur, Stjarnan, KK Pelister, KK Torus BC Rilski Sportist, KK Kozuv and KK Feni Industries.

In 2005, Karadžovski signed with Skallagrímur in the Icelandic Úrvalsdeild karla. After playing two seasons with Skallagrímur, where he averaged 17.0 points and 4.9 assists, Karadžovski signed a 2-year contract with Úrvalsdeild club Stjarnan in May 2007. For the season, he averaged 21.1 points and 5.3 assists. In April 2008, after Stjarnan's season ended, he was fired by the club after he was arrested by the police for grand theft. The Stjarnan's locker room had been plagued with theft during the season and a police search of Karadžovski apartment revealed a large amount of stolen items. An accomplice of his was also arrested on his way out of the country with large amount of stolen items.

On February 18, 2015 he signed with KK Kumanovo.

In March, 2018, he signed with Rabotnički.

In July 2019, he signed with Kožuv.

Macedonia national basketball team 
He played at the 2010 FIBA EuroBasket 2011 qualification with Macedonia national basketball team.

References

External links
  at mreza.mk
  at probasketballoverseas.com
  at dnevnik.com.mk
  at eurobasket.com
  at idividi.com.mk

1984 births
Living people
BC Rilski Sportist players
KK MZT Skopje players
KK Rabotnički players
Macedonian men's basketball players
Sportspeople from Skopje
Skallagrímur men's basketball players
Stjarnan men's basketball players
Úrvalsdeild karla (basketball) players
Guards (basketball)